The Solar Power Tour was the third concert tour by New Zealander singer-songwriter Lorde, in support of her third studio album Solar Power (2021). The tour took place from April 2022 to March 2023, spanning over 70 shows in North America, Europe, Latin America, and Oceania.

The show consisted of three segments and an encore, with two or three costume changes. The set list changed frequently as the tour went on, but consistently featured songs from all three of her studio albums, occasionally performing covers as well.

Background
The Primavera Sound setlist for their 2022 festival was revealed on 25 May 2021, which included Lorde as a headliner. The dates for the Solar Power Tour were announced alongside the tracklist and release date of Solar Power on 21 June 2021. Lorde offered presale tickets for her fans subscribed to her mailing list, with presale tickets available from 24 June 2021 in North America and Europe, and 30 June 2021 in Australia and New Zealand. The general sale opened in North America and Europe on 25 June 2021, and in Australia and New Zealand on 5 July 2021. Taranaki Daily News reported that prices for her concert in New Plymouth started from NZ$89.90 plus fees.

On 24 May 2022, shows for Mexico were added, including Mexico City, Monterrey and Guadalajara. Lorde announced the shows via email with a presale code for fans. A second show for Mexico City was added on June 01st, at Pepsi Center WTC, scheduled for October 11 and 12.  The show in Monterrey is part of the Tecate Live Out Festival. Lorde also announced plans to play a different setlist of the tour in the Mexico shows.

On 25 June 2021, after her two London shows sold out instantly, Lorde added two new dates in London, with a third show in the Roundhouse Theatre scheduled for 3 June 2022, and another performance to close out the tour on 28 June 2022 at Alexandra Palace. A second show was added in Šibenik on the same day, with Croatia Week reporting that tickets for her first show sold out in 3 seconds. Additional shows were also added in Toronto, Boston, New York, Chicago, and Los Angeles.  On 1 July 2021, two additional shows were added in Australia, after "overwhelming demand", with one show each added in Melbourne and Sydney.

It was announced on 10 November 2021 that the Australasian leg of the Solar Power Tour would be postponed to 2023. Lorde said of the decision that "touring internationally through a Covid outbreak has a ton of unforeseen moving parts, and I'd much rather play for you when we're all confident it will go smoothly", and promoters Frontier Touring said that the tour was initially scheduled with the expectation that there would be no restrictions on quarantine and that the borders of Australia and New Zealand would be open to non-citizens. New shows in Lower Hutt, Brisbane, and Perth were also announced.

Setlist 
This set list is representative of the show on 20 April 2022, in Philadelphia. It is not representative of all concerts for the duration of the tour.

 “Leader of a New Regime”
 “Homemade Dynamite”
 “Buzzcut Season”
 “Stoned at the Nail Salon”
 “Fallen Fruit”
 “The Path"
 “California”
 “Ribs”
 “The Louvre”
 “Dominoes”
 “Loveless”
 “Liability”
 “Secrets from a Girl (Who’s Seen It All)”
 “Mood Ring”
 “Sober”
 “Supercut”
 “Perfect Places”
 “Solar Power”
 “Green Light”
 “Oceanic Feeling”

Encore
"400 Lux"
 “Royals”
 “Team”

Shows

Notes

References

2022 concert tours
2023 concert tours
Lorde concert tours
Concert tours postponed due to the COVID-19 pandemic